The 2019–20 season was Çaykur Rizespor's 67th year in existence. In addition to the domestic league, Çaykur Rizespor participated in the Turkish Cup.

Squad

Süper Lig

League table

Results summary

Results by round

Matches

References
 

Çaykur Rizespor seasons
Turkish football clubs 2019–20 season